Diarmuid Connolly (born 7 July 1987) is an Irish Gaelic footballer. His league and championship career at senior level as a forward playing for the Dublin county team initially spanned 11 seasons from 2007 until 2018 when he left the panel after appearing in a league game against Mayo in February 2018.

In July 2019, Dublin senior football manager Jim Gavin confirmed in an interview with Dubs TV that Connolly was back training with the Dublin panel for the 2019 Championship. He went on to win sixth All Ireland title in September 2019.

In October 2020, Connolly announced his retirement from inter-county football.

Early life
Born in Dublin, Connolly inherited a passion for sport from his Kilkenny-born father and Clare-born mother. He was educated at his secondary school Ardscoil Rís where he played competitive Gaelic football and hurling, and attended Scoil Mhuire Marino for Primary School  while he also played soccer with Belvedere F.C. and Home Farm F.C.

Career
Connolly first came to prominence as a Gaelic footballer and hurler at juvenile and underage levels with St Vincent's. He made his debut with the club's senior team in 2004. Since then Connolly has two All-Ireland Club Football medals. He has also won four Leinster medals and four county championship medals.

Connolly made his debut on the inter-county scene when he was selected for the Dublin minor team in 2005. After an unsuccessful minor tenure, he later joined the Dublin under-21 teams as a dual player and won a Leinster medal as a hurler. Connolly made his senior debut during the 2007 O'Byrne Cup. He won five All-Ireland medals, beginning with lone triumphs in 2011 and 2013, and followed by three successive championships from 2015 to 2017. Connolly also won ten Leinster medals and four National League medals. He received two All Star awards in 2014 and 2016.

In June 2017, Connolly received a 12-week ban after physical interference with linesman Ciaran Branagan during Dublin's win against Carlow in the quarter-final of the 2017 Leinster Senior Football Championship.

In March 2018, Connolly left the Dublin senior football panel to spend the summer in Boston playing for Donegal Boston. He subsequently won the championship with the Boston club.

In July 2019, Dublin senior football manager Jim Gavin confirmed in an interview with Dubs TV that Diarmuid Connolly was back training with the Dublin panel for the 2019 championship season.

Peil Star film
In 2016, Diarmuid Connolly appeared in a Street Gaelic Football film created by Peil Star with Dublin teammate Shane Carthy and New York footballer C. J. Molloy. In the video, Connolly kicks a Gaelic football across the River Liffey in Dublin.

Personal life
His grandmother died in February 2021, during the COVID-19 pandemic.

Career statistics

Honours

St Vincents
Dublin Senior Football Championship (5): 2007, 2013, 2014, 2016, 2017
Leinster Senior Club Football Championship (4): 2007, 2013, 2014, 2016
All-Ireland Senior Club Football Championship (2): 2008, 2014

Dublin
 All-Ireland Senior Football Championship (6): 2011, 2013, 2015, 2016, 2017, 2019
 Leinster Senior Football Championship (10): 2007, 2008, 2009, 2011, 2012, 2013, 2014, 2015, 2016,  2017
 National Football League (4): 2013, 2014, 2015, 2016
 O'Byrne Cup (4): 2007, 2008, 2015, 2017
 Leinster Under-21 Hurling Championship (1): 2007

Individual
GAA GPA All-Star Award (2): 2014, 2016

References

1987 births
Living people
Donegal Boston Gaelic footballers
Dublin inter-county Gaelic footballers
Dublin inter-county hurlers
Dual players
Gaelic football forwards
St Vincents (Dublin) Gaelic footballers
St Vincents (Dublin) hurlers
Winners of six All-Ireland medals (Gaelic football)